William T. "Wee Willie" Smith (April 22, 1911 – March 14, 1992) was an American professional basketball player.

Career 
Smith played for several semi-professional leagues in the Cleveland, Ohio area before being signed by the New York Renaissance, an all-black professional team, in 1932. From 1932 to 1936, Smith and his six teammates won over 400 games, including an 88-game winning streak from January 1, 1933 to March 27, 1933. The entire 1932–33 Renaissance team was collectively inducted into the Naismith Memorial Basketball Hall of Fame in 1963. Smith played for several other professional teams, including the Cleveland Chase Brassmen of the National Basketball League. He was one of the few black players in the history of the NBL.

After retiring from professional basketball, he worked as a custodian in the Cleveland Public Schools and operated a beverage shop. He was inducted into the Harlem Hall of Fame and the Greater Cleveland Sports Hall of Fame in 1977.

References

External links
 Basketball-Reference profile

African-American basketball players
Basketball players from Montgomery, Alabama
Basketball players from Cleveland
Centers (basketball)
Cleveland Chase Brassmen players
Dayton Rens players
New York Renaissance players
1911 births
1992 deaths
American men's basketball players
20th-century African-American sportspeople